Tick Creek is a  long 3rd order tributary to the Rocky River in Chatham County, North Carolina.

Course
Tick Creek rises in a pond on the Love Creek divide about 4 miles south of Siler City, North Carolina in Chatham County and then flows south and makes a curve to the northeast to join the Rocky River about 5 miles southeast of Siler City.

Watershed
Tick Creek drains  of area, receives about 47.7 in/year of precipitation, has a wetness index of 411.49 and is about 55% forested.

References

Rivers of North Carolina
Rivers of Chatham County, North Carolina